Seventeen Years Old (Swedish: Sjutton år) is a 1957 Swedish drama film directed by Alf Kjellin and starring Ingeborg Nyberg, Randi Kolstad and Isa Quensel. It was shot at the Centrumateljéerna Studios in Stockholm. The film's sets were designed by the art director Nils Nilsson.

Cast
 Ingeborg Nyberg as Anna-Lena Sander
 Tage Severin as 	Allan Bentick
 Randi Kolstad as 	Lydia Hennert, Singer
 Georg Rydeberg as 	Emil Bentick
 Isa Quensel as 	Agnes Bentick
 Naima Wifstrand as 	Clara
 Gun Hellberg as 	Brita Sander
 Bengt Brunskog as 	Erik Sander
 Kerstin Dunér as 	Karin Strand
 Ulf Lindqvist as 	Uno Vallius
 Birger Lensanderas Jernberg
 Helge Hagerman as 	Bengt Sander, Priest
 Bo Samuelsson as Sune Karlsson, Mechanic
 John Kilián as 	Taky

References

Bibliography 
 Qvist, Per Olov & von Bagh, Peter. Guide to the Cinema of Sweden and Finland. Greenwood Publishing Group, 2000.

External links 
 

1957 films
Swedish drama films
1957 drama films
1950s Swedish-language films
Films directed by Alf Kjellin
Films based on Swedish novels
1950s Swedish films